Little Tokyo, also known as Little Tokyo Historic District,  is an ethnically Japanese American district in downtown Los Angeles and the heart of the largest Japanese-American population in North America. It is the largest and most populous of only three official Japantowns in the United States, all of which are in California (the other two are Japantown, San Francisco and Japantown, San Jose).  Founded around the beginning of the 20th century, the area, sometimes called Lil' Tokyo, J-Town, 小東京 (Shō-tōkyō), is the cultural center for Japanese Americans in Southern California. It was declared a National Historic Landmark District in 1995.

History

In 1905 the area of "Little Tokyo" was described as "bounded by San Pedro, First and Requena streets and Central Avenue. The Los Angeles Times added: "It has a population of about 3,500 Japanese, with quite a colony of Jews and Russians and a few Americans. . . . there are 10,000 Japanese in the city who make this section their rendezvous."

The area was a magnet for immigrating Japanese until the Exclusion Act of 1924 halted any further migration. Shops were along First Street, and vegetable markets were along Central Avenue to the south. Japanese Americans were a significant ethnic group in the vegetable trade, due to the number of successful Japanese American truck farms across Southern California. In 1941, there were approximately 30,000 Japanese Americans living in Little Tokyo.

The incarceration of Japanese Americans during World War II emptied Little Tokyo. For a brief time, the area became known as Bronzeville as African Americans and also Native Americans and Latinos moved into the vacated properties and opened up nightclubs, restaurants, and other businesses. Beginning in 1942, after the city's Japanese population was rounded up and "evacuated" to inland concentration camps, a large number of African Americans from the South moved to Los Angeles to find work in the labor-starved defense industry. Its share in the Second Great Migration almost tripled Little Tokyo's pre-war population, with some 80,000 new arrivals taking up residence there. Prohibited from buying and renting in most parts of the city by restrictive covenants, the area soon became severely overcrowded. A single bathroom was often shared by up to 40 people and one room could house as many as 16; people frequently shared "hot beds," sleeping in shifts. Poor housing conditions helped spread communicable illnesses like tuberculosis and venereal disease. Crimes like robberies, rapes, and hit-and-run accidents increased, and in May and June 1943 Latino and some African American residents of Bronzeville were attacked by whites in the Zoot Suit race riots. In 1943, officials bowed to pressure from frustrated residents and proposed building temporary housing in nearby Willowbrook, but the majority-white residents of the unincorporated city resisted the plans. In 1944, 57 Bronzeville buildings were condemned as unfit for habitation and 125 ordered repaired or renovated; approximately 50 of the evicted families were sent to the Jordan Downs housing complex. In 1945, many defense industry jobs disappeared and the workers moved elsewhere in search of new employment. Others were pushed out when Japanese Americans began to return and white landlords chose not to renew leases with their wartime tenants.

After the war, due to lack of housing in Little Tokyo, many Japanese Americans returning from the camps moved into neighborhoods surrounding the downtown area, into apartments and boarding houses. Notably, Boyle Heights, just east of Little Tokyo, had a large Japanese American population in the 1950s (as it had before the internment) until the arrival of Mexican and Latino immigrants replaced most of them.

In the late 1970s, a redevelopment movement started as Japanese corporations expanded overseas operations and many of them set up their US headquarters in the Los Angeles area. Several new shopping plazas and hotels opened, along with branches of some major Japanese banks. Although this redevelopment resulted in many new buildings and shopping centers, there are still some of the original Little Tokyo buildings and restaurants, especially along First Street.

During the 1970s and 1980s, artists began to move into nearby aging warehouse spaces in the area, forming a hidden community in the industrialized area. Al's Bar, Gorky's, the Atomic Cafe, and LA Contemporary Exhibitions (LACE) are some well-known sites.

Land use has been a contentious issue in Little Tokyo due to its history, the proximity to the Los Angeles Civic Center, the role of Los Angeles as a site of business between Japan and America, and the increasing influx of residents into the Arts District. Unlike a traditional ethnic enclave, there are relatively few Japanese residents in the area because of evacuation and internment. The Japanese American community was politicized by the internment and subsequent Redress and Reparations effort. This politicization, along with the global and local growth of overseas Japanese investment, has assured that Little Tokyo has continued to exist as a tourist attraction, community center, and home to Japanese American senior citizens and others.

The current site of Parker Center, the Los Angeles Police Department's former headquarters, was the original site of the Nishi Hongwanji Buddhist temple. The south edge of the block where Parker Center stands was part of the First Street business strip of shops. The warehouses and new condominiums to the east of Little Tokyo were once residential areas of the district. The Weller Court mall was opposed by some people in the community because it redeveloped a strip of family-owned small businesses. Community activists established First Street as a historic district in 1986. In 2004, they helped reopen the Far East Cafe, an acknowledged community hub.

In 1959, Los Angeles entered a sister city relationship with the city of Nagoya. Nagoya is Los Angeles' oldest sister city, along with Eilat, Israel.

Description

At its peak, Little Tokyo had approximately 30,000 Japanese Americans living in the area. Little Tokyo is still a cultural focal point for Los Angeles's Japanese American population. It is mainly a work, cultural, religious, restaurant and shopping district, because Japanese Americans today are likely to live in nearby cities such as Torrance, Gardena, and Monterey Park, as well as the Sawtelle district in the Westside of Los Angeles. However, the recent boom in downtown residential construction is changing the nature of Little Tokyo.

What is left of the original Little Tokyo can be found in roughly five large city blocks. It is bounded on the west by Los Angeles Street, on the east by Alameda Street, on the south by 3rd Street, and on the north by First Street, but also includes a substantial portion of the block north of First and west of Alameda, location of the Japanese American National Museum, the Go For Broke Monument, and a row of historic shops which lines the north side of First Street.  A timeline has been set into the concrete in front of these shops, using bronze lettering, showing the history of each of the shops from the early 20th Century until the renovation of the district in the late 1980s. More broadly, Little Tokyo is bordered by the Los Angeles River to the east, downtown Los Angeles to the west, L.A. City Hall the Parker Center to the north, and Skid Row to the south.

Attractions

Museums and galleries

Museums include the Japanese American National Museum and an extension of the Museum of Contemporary Art, formerly called the Temporary Contemporary and now known as the Geffen Contemporary (named after David Geffen).  Additionally, the visual arts are represented by the arts non-profit, LAArtcore which devotes itself to creating awareness of the visual arts through 24 exhibitions each year along with educational programming.  An art gallery called 123 Astronaut is housed within a kiosk on Astronaut Ellison Onizuka Street and contains a monument to Astronaut Ellison S. Onizuka, a Japanese American from Hawaii who was a mission specialist on the Space Shuttle Challenger when it disintegrated during takeoff in 1986.

Public art 
Little Tokyo has a variety of public art, including a memorial statue of Chiune Sugihara, Japanese consul to Lithuania before World War II and Righteous among the Nations.

Events 
The Nisei Week festival is held every August, and includes a large parade, a pageant, athletic events, exhibits of Japanese art and culture, a taiko drum festival, the Japanese Festival Street Faire, a car show, and other events.

Gardens 
There are also two Japanese gardens in the area open to the public: the James Irvine garden in the Japanese American Cultural and Community Center and a rooftop garden in the Kyoto Grand Hotel and Gardens, formerly the New Otani Hotel. The Go for Broke Monument commemorates Japanese Americans who served in the United States Military during World War II.

Performing arts

With its proximity to Hollywood and its concentration as a focal point for the Pan Asian American community, Little Tokyo Los Angeles has long served as an incubator for Asian American and Pacific Islander artists and performers sporting a high concentration of legacy institutions.

East West Players, one of the nation's first Asian American theater companies and the longest continuously running theatre of color in the nation, specializing in live theater written and performed by Asian American artists, is located in Little Tokyo, performing in the David Henry Hwang Theater, a 230-seat venue in the Union Center for the Performing Arts.

The Japanese American Community and Cultural Center (JACCC) runs the 800 seat Aratani Theater, which features theatre, dance, concerts as well as cultural performances and events.

Visual Communications, an Asian Pacific American media arts organization that annually presents VC FilmFest (Los Angeles Asian Pacific Film Festival), in several venues around Little Tokyo.

Tuesday Night Project is the longest running Asian American open Mic event in the nation running every 1st and 3rd Tuesday from April through October in the public courtyard of the Union Center for the Arts

Cold Tofu Improv was founded in 1981 as the nation's first Asian American Improv & Comedy Group. Teaching classes in short form and long form improv.

Kollaboration founded in 2000, is an organization focusing on advancing Asian, Pacific Islander, and Desi Americans (APIDA) in the Music and entertainment industries.  With affiliates in San Francisco, Atlanta, Hawaii, Houston, Boston and throughout the country, the organization hosts its annual national culmination "KOLLABORATION STAR" event at the Aratani Theatre, as well as their EMPOWER conference as incubator events for APIDA artists in the music industry.

With the proximity of these organizations and Arts non-profit organizations, many notable actors, musicians and entertainers of AAPI descent have either begun their careers here, or continue to maintain a presence. East West Players saw the early careers of actors such as Daniel Dae Kim, John Cho, Reggie Lee, Amy Hill, Lucy Liu, Isa Briones, as well as playwrights Qui Nguyen. Lauren Yee, and David Henry Hwang.  In 2018, actor George Takei returned to Little Tokyo for the first Post Broadway staging of the musical Allegiance by Jay Kuo & Lorenzo Thione co-produced by East West Players and the JACCC at the Aratani Theatre.  The Aratani has also served as a home venue to the Grammy Nominated Jazz fusion group Hiroshima (band) founded by Dan Kuramoto & June Kuramoto. Actress Tamlyn Tomita began her career when she was crowned "Nisei Week Queen" in 1984 which led to her breakout casting in The Karate Kid Part 2. Filmmakers such as Justin Lin, Quentin Lee, and Justin Chon have premiered some of their early career making films at the Los Angeles Asian Pacific Film Festival. Actor Dante Basco has been a mainstay performing his poetry alongside many others at Tuesday Night Project. Musicians such as AJ Rafael, Jane Lui, MC Jin and more have long relationships with Kollaboration since before the "youtube-boom" that saw many AAPI artists and musicians find an internet based audience.

Little Tokyo continues to be a major convening point for AAPI artists in the entertainment industry, and a central incubator for the nation having twice before hosted the National Asian American Theatre Conference and Festival put on by the Consortium of Asian American Theatre Artists.  Little Tokyo has also seen the rise of many adjacent movements in the AAPI entertainment world such as Asian American theater companies Teada, Lodestone Theatre, Artists at Play, Hereandnow Theatre, Asian AF Comedy shows, and the Comedy Comedy Festival.

Shopping and dining

There are numerous Japanese restaurants, catering to both Japanese and non-Japanese clientele. Many of them specialize in one type of Japanese cuisine, such as donburi, Japanese noodles (soba, ramen and udon), shabu-shabu (which translated from Japanese means 'swish-swish', referring to the motion of dipping meat and vegetables in a communal bowl of boiling water), Japanese curry, sushi, or yakitori. There are also a number of yakiniku restaurants, where meat is often cooked on a small grill built into the center of the table.  Little Tokyo is the birthplace of the California roll, invented by a chef named Ichiro Mashita at the Tokyo Kaikan sushi restaurant.

Two wagashi (Japanese sweets) shops located in Little Tokyo are among the oldest food establishments in Los Angeles.  Fugetsu-do, founded in 1903, appears to be the oldest still-operating food establishment in the city and the first one to celebrate a centennial; its best-known offerings include mochi and manjū, and it claims to be an inventor of the fortune cookie. Mikawaya was founded in 1910, but is now well known as the company that introduced mochi ice cream to the United States in 1994.

Little Tokyo has several shops that specialize in Japanese-language videos and DVDs, while other shops specialize in Japanese electronics and video games. These are a great way to find Japanese video games that were either never translated into English, or were never domestically released in North America. There are also several stores that sell manga and anime related products.

Japanese Village Plaza

The Japanese Village Plaza is located roughly in the center of Little Tokyo on the east side of San Pedro Street. There are several restaurants in the plaza, plus a number of shops geared towards tourists.  First Street and Second Street border Japanese Village Plaza and have a number of restaurants that are open later than those in the court.

Weller Court

The Weller Court shopping mall is located along Astronaut Ellison S Onizuka St., backing up to 2nd St. on the south and what was originally the New Otani Hotel, now the DoubleTree by Hilton Hotel Los Angeles Downtown, along Los Angeles Street, to the north and west. It has several restaurants, karaoke clubs, and a Bubble Tea cafe. For tourists visiting from Japan, there are a number of shops specializing in expensive name brand products such as Coach handbags. There is also a large bookstore, Kinokuniya, that is part of a well-known Japanese chain. They have a large selection of Japanese-language books, magazines, music CDs, manga, and anime, as well as a selection of English-language books on Japanese subjects and translated manga and anime.

Weller Court was the second major project of the East West Development Corporation in association with the Community Redevelopment Agency, after the $30 million New Otani. The architect was Kajima Associates.

In the 1920s, the southeast corner of First Street was the beginning of Little Tokyo. At this corner was the Tomio Building, home to the Japanese-American Tomio Department Store, and two more Japanese-American department stores, the Asia Company and Hori Brothers.

Education
The area is served by the Los Angeles Unified School District.
 9th Street Elementary School
Hollenbeck Middle School
Belmont High School

Los Angeles Public Library operates the Little Tokyo Branch.

The main office of the Asahi Gakuen, a part-time Japanese school, is in room 308 on the third floor of the Japanese American Cultural & Community Center (JACCC, 日米文化会館 Nichibei Bunka Kaikan) building, located in Little Tokyo.

Religion

There are several Buddhist temples in or near Little Tokyo, representing many major schools of Japanese Buddhism: Jodo Shinshu, Jodo Shu, Shingon, Nichiren, and Soto Zen. They are Zenshuji Soto Mission, Los Angeles Hompa Hongwanji (usually called Nishi Hongwanji), Higashi Honganji, Koyasan Buddhist Temple, Nichiren Shu Beikoku Betsuin, and the Jodo Shu North America Buddhist Missions. Together they form the Los Angeles Buddhist Temple Federation (Jodo Shinshu temples in Long Beach and near USC are also members).

Little Tokyo is also home to Japanese American Christian communities. Centenary United Methodist Church was founded in 1896 by first-generation Japanese American immigrants. Union Church of Los Angeles, founded in 1918, represents a long tradition of Japanese American Presbyterianism. 

St. Francis Xavier Chapel and Japanese Catholic Center (also known as "Maryknoll") has been the base of the Japanese Catholic community in Los Angeles since 1912. Father Albert Breton, a Japanese-speaking missionary of the Paris Foreign Mission Society (M.E.P.) with the support of Bishop Thomas Conaty of the Diocese of Los Angeles, established the community on December 25, 1912, with the first Japanese mass celebrated at the Bronson House on Jackson Street near the current Fukui Mortuary on Temple Street. The center also formerly housed the Maryknoll School administered by the Maryknoll Fathers from the early 1920s until the mid-1990s. Currently, masses are offered in Japanese and English each Sunday.

One of the roots of Pentecostalism started in Little Tokyo. Where the Japanese American Cultural and Community Center Plaza is now located was once the home of the First Pentecostal Church, a multiracial congregation called the Azusa Street Mission. This is where the Azusa Street Revival started in 1906. Earlier, it was also the site of the First AME Church.

The former Catholic Cathedral of Saint Vibiana is just to the west of Little Tokyo. After being heavily damaged in the 1994 Northridge earthquake, the Archdiocese moved to a new site (now the Cathedral of Our Lady of the Angels) and the old site was redeveloped with the former cathedral converted into a performing arts space and non-historic buildings on the site demolished and replaced with a new Little Tokyo Branch of the Los Angeles Public Library.

Transportation

The community is served by the Metro L Line at Little Tokyo/Arts District station at the northeastern perimeter of Little Tokyo and is also walkable from the Metro B and D subway lines at either Civic Center/Grand Park station or Union Station – with connections to Amtrak, Metrolink, Metro J Line BRT, and Foothill Transit's Silver Streak BRT services. When the A and E Lines connect to the L Line, via the Regional Connector, the Little Tokyo/Arts District station will be moved underground and across the street. This required demolition of two modest, one-story brick buildings. The two structures played an important role in the cultural life of the neighborhood for decades with one of the structures dating back at least to 1898.
Metro Local lines 30 and 330 serve Little Tokyo. In March 2020, Metro selected a development firm responsible for constructing the new Regional Connector station. Community representatives from the Little Tokyo Business Association, the Japanese American National Museum, and former U.S. Transportation Secretary Norman Mineta expressed their concerns about Metro's decision. Matters regarding the selection process, community needs, and design aesthetics delayed the project. The Little Tokyo/Arts District station is slated for completion in early 2023.

In popular culture
The district appears in the films Showdown in Little Tokyo, Beverly Hills Ninja and The Crimson Kimono. When the Japanese anime series  was localized in English as Samurai Pizza Cats, the series' main setting "Edoropolis" was renamed "Little Tokyo".

See also

 History of the Japanese in Los Angeles
 List of Buddhist temples
 List of districts and neighborhoods of Los Angeles
 Sawtelle Boulevard
 Shoson Nagahara

References

Further reading
 Arnold, Bruce Makoto. "Pacific Childhood Dreams and Desires in the Rafu: Multiple Transnational Modernisms and the Los Angeles Nisei, 1918–1942".
 Arnold, Bruce Makoto. "The Japanese Ethnopole as Determinant: The Effects of the Japantowns on Second-Generation Japanese-Americans".
 Nakagawa, Martha. "Little Tokyo / Bronzeville, Los Angeles, California"

External links

 
 
 
 
Map of Little Tokyo Japantown, Los Angeles
Little Tokyo Japantown Guide
 
 
 
 
 
 
 
 
 
 
 
 
 
 
 
 
 

 
Japanese-American culture in California